The New South Wales Sputnik suburban carriage stock is a type of electric multiple unit that was operated by the New South Wales Government Railways and its successors between 1957 and 1993 and served on the Sydney rail network.

These trains, as well as other types of single-deck suburban electrics that were first manufactured in the 1920s, are known by Sydneysiders as "Red Rattlers".

History
Between 1956 and 1960, 40 power cars and 40 trailer cars were built by Commonwealth Engineering for the New South Wales Government Railways. Broadly similar to the Tulloch built carriages, built earlier in the 1950s, they differed in having motors on all four (as opposed to two) bogies and power operated doors. They operated as eight carriage sets and were targeted as S sets, gaining the nickname Sputniks after the Russian satellite that was launched at the same time as their entry into service.

Ostensibly built to provide rolling stock for the newly electrified Parramatta to Penrith section of the Main Western line, they operated across the Sydney suburban network.

Following the delivery of the Tulloch double deck trailers from 1964, these replaced the original trailers in the S sets. The displaced carriages had their power door equipment disconnected, were fitted with manually operated door equipment and pooled with the Suburban and Tulloch stock. These were renumbered upwards by 50, e.g. T4701 became T4751.

Originally painted Tuscan red, from 1973 they were repainted in the Public Transport Commission blue and white livery before the livery was replaced with indian red in 1976. The interiors were originally painted brown and cream with the later repaints being in two-tone green.

Overhauls of the stock continued up until 1988, with some receiving sliding aluminium Beclawat windows to alleviate rust problems. Most of the trailer cars remained in service until the end of single deck operation in January 1992. The last power cars were withdrawn in November 1993. Several have been preserved.

Preservation 

Sydney Trains has three Commonwealth Engineering Sputnik cars in the care of Historic Electric Traction.
C3702 - Commonwealth Engineering (4 motor) Power Car - Under Restoration at Redfern Carriageworks
C3708 - Commonwealth Engineering (4 motor) Power Car - Under Restoration at Redfern Carriageworks
T4790 - Commonwealth Engineering Trailer Car (ex T4740) - Stored at Redfern Carriageworks

On 8 May 2019, C3704 (Commonwealth Engineering (4 motor) Power Car) was removed from the Australian Technology Park and relocated to Taree to a private buyer. It was previously owned by 3801 Limited (now East Coast Heritage Rail) and was used as a site office.

Privately owned cars

References

Electric multiple units of New South Wales
Train-related introductions in 1957
1500 V DC multiple units of New South Wales